Minuscule 596 (in the Gregory-Aland numbering), Θε 12 (von Soden), is a Greek minuscule manuscript of the New Testament, on parchment. Palaeographically it has been assigned to the 11th century. The manuscript is lacunose. It was labelled by Scrivener as 465.
It has marginalia.

Description 

The codex contains the text of the Gospel of Matthew-Gospel of Mark on 228 parchment leaves (size ) with lacunae. The codex ends in Mark 12:17. The text is written in one column per page, 29 lines per page.

It contains a Theophylact's commentary.

Text 

The Greek text of the codex is a representative of the Byzantine text-type. Aland placed it in Category V.

History 

Formerly it was held in "Archivo" in Venice. The manuscript was added to the list of New Testament manuscripts by F. H. A. Scrivener. It was examined by Dean Burgon. Gregory saw it in 1886.

The manuscript currently is housed at the Biblioteca Marciana (Gr. I,57 (995)), at Venice.

See also 

 List of New Testament minuscules
 Biblical manuscript
 Textual criticism

References

Further reading 

 

Greek New Testament minuscules
11th-century biblical manuscripts